This is a list of notable alumni and current students of Bryant University.

Business 

 Otto Frederick Hunziker – dairy industry pioneer

Politics 

 Douglas H. Fisher – New Jersey Secretary of Agriculture
 Dominick J. Ruggerio – President of the Rhode Island Senate and state senator from the 4th district
 Antonio Giarrusso – Senior Deputy Minority Leader of the Rhode Island House of Representatives and state representative from the 30th district
 Kenneth Marshall – Senior Deputy Majority Leader of the Rhode Island House of Representatives and state representative from the 68th district
 Harold Metts – President Pro Tempore of the Rhode Island Senate and state senator from the 6th district
 Jeanine Calkin – State senator from the 30th district 
 Frank Ciccone – Chair of the Rhode Island Senate Committee on Housing and Municipal Government and state senator from the 7th District
 Scott A. Slater – Deputy Majority Leader of the Rhode Island House of Representatives and state representative from the 10th district

Arts and entertainment 

 Nicholas Colasanto – actor, known for his roles in Cheers, Starsky & Hutch, and Chips
 Mikayla Nogueira – social media influencer and makeup artist

Sports 
Ben Altit (born 1993) – Israeli basketball player for Hapoel Be'er Sheva of the Israeli Premier League
 Doug Edert – Current Bulldogs basketball player most notable as a breakout star of Saint Peter's 2022 NCAA tournament run
 Zack Greer – Major League Lacrosse player for the Long Island Lizards; National Lacrosse League player for the Minnesota Swarm
 James Karinchak – pitcher for the Cleveland Guardians
 Benjamin Schulte – Guamanian swimmer

References

External links 
 Bryant University website

 
Bryant University alumni